Shukla is a word of Sanskrit origin that means "bright" or "white". Similar to what goes for Shukla Paksha (शुक्लपक्ष) bright moonlight during waxing phase. These are the highest caste of Brahmins. Traditionally, people with Shukla surname have been found in the North Indian states and the Gangetic Plains, although significant numbers are present in other parts of the country as well. 

Notable people with the name include: 

 Abhay Shukla, Indian TV actor known for his role as Inspector Nikhil in TV series CID
 Abhinav Shukla (producer), Indian film and TV producer
 Abhinav Shukla, Indian actor
 Ajai Shukla, Indian army officer, journalist and defense analyst
 Amarjeet Shukla, Indian actor
 Anand Shukla, Indian cricketer who played first-class cricket from 1960 to 1978
 Anand Swaroop Shukla, Indian politician and a member of 17th Legislative Assembly of Uttar Pradesh state of India
 Anjuli Shukla, Indian film director and cinematographer, first and till date the only Indian woman to win the National Film Award for Best Cinematography
 Amitabh Shukla, Indian film editor, most known for his work in Chak De! India, Krrish, Holiday and Chalte Chalte
 Amitesh Shukla, INC Politician, member Chhattisgarh Legislative Assembly and former Minister of Rural Development in the Government of Chhattisgarh
 Aseem Shukla, Director of Minimally Invasive Surgery in the Department of Urology at the Children's Hospital of Philadelphia, PA
 Ashish Shukla, Indian author on geopolitics and terrorism, former editor of Cricket Samrat
 Ashthabhuja Prasad Shukla, Indian politician, member of the 10th Lok Sabha (Lower House) of the Indian Parliament
 Avay Shukla, Indian Administrative Service officer, environmentalist and writer
 Baikuntha Shukla, Indian nationalist and revolutionary
 Balkrishna Khanderao Shukla, Indian politician and Member of Parliament of the 15th Lok Sabha (Lower House) of the Indian Parliament from Vadodara
 Balram Shukla, Indian poet and academic
 Bhagwati Prasad Shukla, Indian politician and member of the Bharatiya Janata Party from Lucknow, Uttar Pradesh
 Chakrapani Shukla, Member of Parliament, India
 Champa Devi Shukla, activist from Bhopal, India and recipient of the Goldman Environmental Prize, 2004
 Chandra Prakash Shukla, Indian politician and a member of 17th Legislative Assembly of Uttar Pradesh state of India
 Chitra Shukla, Indian actress who works in Telugu-Kannada language films
 Daisy Irani (actress) (Daisy Irani Shukla), Indian actress in Hindi and Telugu language films
Damubhai Shukla, founder in 1935 of Navchetan School in Ahmedabad, Gujarat
 Deepak Shukla, American molecular virologist with expertise in herpesviruses
 Haimanti Sukla, Bengali singer
 Jagadish Shukla, Indian meteorologist, professor at George Mason University, Virginia
 Jang Bahadur Shukla, Indian mathematician
 Jhanak Shukla, Indian actress
Jugal Kishore Shukla, publisher from 1826 of Udant Martand, the first Hindi newspaper
 Jyoti Kiran (Jyoti Kiran Shukla), Indian politician, activist, educationist, strategist and Chair of Rajasthan's 5th State Finance Commission
 Kamlesh Shukla, Indian politician from the BJP and a member of 17th Legislative Assembly of Uttar Pradesh of India
 Karuna Shukla, member of the 14th Lok Sabha of India, representing Janjgir constituency of Chhattisgarh
 Krishna Kant Shukla, Indian physicist, musician, poet, ecologist and educator
 Laxmi Ratan Shukla, Indian cricketer and politician
 Mahendra Shukla, Indian first-class cricketer
 Manoj Muntashir, Indian lyricist, poet and screenwriter
 Mukesh Shukla, or Mukesh, businessman and politician in Uganda
 Munna Shukla, Kathak guru and choreographer of Lucknow Gharana
 Narayan Shukla (also known as SN Shukla), judge of the Allahabad High Court
 Nikesh Shukla, British author and screenwriter
 Padma Kant Shukla (1950–2015), Indian physicist, university professor in several countries
 Prabhat Prakash Shukla, Indian diplomat, Ambassador to Russia
 Pratibha Shukla, Indian politician and member of the Uttar Pradesh Legislative Assembly from Akbarpur-Raniya constituency
 Pravina Shukla, professor of folklore at Indiana University Bloomington
 Rahul Shukla, Indian first-class cricketer from Jaunpur district who plays for Jharkhand in domestic cricket
 Raj Shukla, Lieutenant General, YSM, SM, currently serving as General Officer Commanding-in-Chief (GOC-in-C) Army Training Command (ARTRAC)
 Raj Kumar Shukla, Indian freedom fighter, who convinced Mahatma Gandhi to visit Champaran for the Champaran Satyagraha
 Rajeev Shukla, Indian politician, journalist, political commentator and the former chairman of Indian Premier League. Presently, VP of BCCI
 Rajendra Shukla (poet), Gujarati poet
 Rajendra Shukla (politician), Indian politician and MLA from Madhya Pradesh
 Rajendra Prasad Shukla, politician from Madhya Pradesh and Chhattisgarh, who also served as Speaker of both states' Legislative Assembly
 Rajesh Shukla, Indian politician and member of the Bharatiya Janata Party from Uttarakhand State
 Rajesh Shukla (statistician), Indian researcher, author and applied statistician
 Rakesh Shukla (animal welfare activist), Indian entrepreneur, motivational speaker and animal welfare activist
 Rakesh Shukla (cricketer), Indian cricketer, cricket consultant and commentator
 Ram Chandra Shukla (1925–2016), Indian painter and art critic
 Ram Kishore Shukla, Indian National Congress leader
 Ramchandra Shukla (1884–1941), known as Acharya Shukla, Indian historian of Hindi literature
 Ravishankar Shukla, premier of CP & Berar and the first Chief Minister of Madhya Pradesh
 Ravikant Shukla, Indian first class cricketer, former captain of India U19 national cricket team
 Ravi Kishan, or Ravindra Shyamnarayan Shukla, Indian actor, politician and TV personality; MP (Lok Sabha) from Gorakhpur, Uttar Pradesh
 Richa Moorjani (nee Shukla), Indian-American actress who is best known for her role as Kamala in the series Never Have I Ever
 Rishi Kumar Shukla, Indian Police Service officer and director of Central Bureau of Investigation (CBI)
 Rishabh Shukla, Indian film and television actor and a voice-dubbing artist
 Riya Shukla, Indian television actress and model who made her film debut with Nil Battey Sannata
 Rohit Shukla, Major at the Indian Army, Shaurya Chakra awardee
 Sanyam Shukla, Indian badminton player
 S.N.Shukla, Indian politician
 Sandeep Shukla, Professor at the Indian Institute of Technology, Kanpur
 Saurabh Shukla, Indian actor
 Shilpa Shukla, Indian actress
 Shivakant Shukla, Indian cricketer
 Shiv Pratap Shukla, Governor of Himachal Pradesh, Former Member of Parliament (Rajya Sabha), former Minister of State for Finance, Government of India
 Shyama Charan Shukla, three-term Chief Minister of Madhya Pradesh, irrigation visionary and aviator
 Sidharth Shukla, Indian actor and model.
 Shrilal Shukla (1925–2011), Hindi writer, recipient of the Jnanpith Award
 Shri Prakash Shukla, Indian gangster and contract killer
 Supriya Shukla, Indian television and film actress
 Umesh Shukla, Indian movie director, best known for Oh My God
 Vidya Charan Shukla, Indian cabinet minister
 Vidya Dhar Shukla, Chief Hindu Priest of Thailand
 Vijai Shukla, Indian-Danish food scientist
 Vijay Kumar Shukla, or Munna Shukla, former Member of the Legislative Assembly (MLA) from Bihar, India
 Vikramaditya Shukla, Indian film actor who has appeared in Tamil and Telugu language films
 Vinay Shukla, Indian film writer and director, producer of Godmother
 Vinod Kumar Shukla, modern Hindi writer and recipient of the Sahitya Akademi Award
 Yogendra Shukla, Indian nationalist, freedom fighter, among the founders of Hindustan Socialist Republican ASSOCIATION

Others 
 Shuklaganj, a suburb of Kanpur, Uttar Pradesh, situated on the banks of holy river Ganges

References

Indian surnames